Eve Edwards may refer to:

 Pen name of Julia Golding, British novelist
 Evangeline Edwards (1888–1957), Professor Chinese at SOAS, University of London